Beth Elon is a Queen Anne style house built in Henrico County, Virginia, three miles from Richmond, Virginia, in 1890.  It was listed on the National Register of Historic Places in 2003.  The listing includes 2 contributing buildings and one other contributing site.

It was the home of Leslie and Laura Watson, who were musicians, early members of the American Guild of Organists.

References

Houses on the National Register of Historic Places in Virginia
Queen Anne architecture in Virginia
Houses completed in 1890
Houses in Henrico County, Virginia
National Register of Historic Places in Henrico County, Virginia